(Evening sounds), WAB 110, is a character piece for violin and piano, which Anton Bruckner composed in 1866.

History 

Bruckner composed the piece on 7 June 1866. He dedicated it to Hugo von Grienberger, a civil servant in the district court. It is not known when the piece was performed.

A facsimile of it was first published in Band I, pp. 104–105 of the Göllerich/Auer biography.

Music 

The 36-bar long work in E minor is scored for violin and piano. Of the 36 bars only 14 (bars 17-20 and 23-32) are played by the violin.

Discography 
There are three recordings of Abendklänge:
 Josef Sabaini (violin), Thomas Kerbl (piano), Anton Bruckner Chöre/Klaviermusik – CD: LIVA 034, 2009
 Wolfgang Göllner (violin), Albert Sassmann (piano), 5 aus Österreich – CD: KKV Records
 Alexander Knaak (violin), Daniel Linton-France (piano) in: Bruckner, Anton – Böck liest Bruckner II – CD: Gramola 99237, 2020

References

Sources 
 August Göllerich, Anton Bruckner. Ein Lebens- und Schaffens-Bild,  – posthumous edited by Max Auer by G. Bosse, Regensburg, 1932
 Anton Bruckner – Sämtliche Werke, Band XII/7: Abendklänge for violin and piano, Musikwissenschaftlicher Verlag der Internationalen Bruckner-Gesellschaft, Walburga Litschauer (editor), Vienna, 1995
 Cornelis van Zwol, Anton Bruckner 1824–1896 – Leven en werken, uitg. Thoth, Bussum, Netherlands, 2012. 
 Uwe Harten, Anton Bruckner. Ein Handbuch. , Salzburg, 1996. .
 Crawford Howie, Anton Bruckner - A documentary biography, online revised edition

External links 
 
 Abendklänge e-Moll, WAB 110 Critical discography by Hans Roelofs 
 A live performance by Laurens Weinhold (violin) and Philipp Scheucher (piano) in St. Florian (17 August 2020) can be heard on Abendklänge

Chamber music by Anton Bruckner
1866 compositions
Compositions in E minor